

Moto Rapido Racing is a motorbike racing team, currently competing in the British Superbike Championship. For the first half of the 2018 season, the superbike rider was Taylor Mackenzie, who replaced injured American John Hopkins. For the second half of the 2018 season Tommy Bridewell succeeded Mackenzie as sole BSB rider. He was retained for 2019 finishing in third place with 636 points, and is contracted again for 2020.

Thomas Strudwick also rode during 2017 in Motostar standard class.

History 
The Moto Rapido Ducati team progressed to the MCE Insurance British Superbike Championship in 2011 after a season in the National Superstock 1000 Championship with Scott Smart.

From then the team competed in many seasons with a Ducati Superstock 1000 including a maiden race win with Tristan Palmer. They also entered the British Superbike class and every race improved their bike and results.

In 2015 the team signed a deal with Lloyds British to compete in the Superbike class with Czech contender Jakub Smrž, but after several good results, Smrz had a crash at the Snetterton Circuit, meaning he would be out. American John Hopkins took his place as a replacement rider and took the team to a record result at the final round of the 2015 season of 3rd place.

In 2016 the team signed Danny Buchan but after a successful start to the year in testing, things didn't work during the start of the season. The team's replacement rider was Scotsman Stuart Easton, but he also dropped out, and Ducati test rider Alessandro Polita was the final rider of the season.

For 2017 the team signed American John Hopkins to compete in the British Superbike class. Hopkins was badly injured at Brands Hatch requiring extensive surgeries and physical rehabilitation that effectively ended his racing career.

For the first half of the 2018 season, the superbike rider was Taylor Mackenzie, who replaced John Hopkins. The team and Mackenzie announced their mutual decision to part company at the Knockhill BSB round practice session on 7 July, due to the rider's poor results.

For the second half of 2018 and the full 2019 season the rider was Tommy Bridewell.

References

External links 
 Moto Rapido Racing Official Website
 2019 British Superbike Team Profile

Motorcycle racing teams
Motorcycle racing teams established in 2010
2010 establishments in the United Kingdom